Jaspal is a given name. Notable people with the name include:

Jaspal Atwal (born 1955), Indo-Canadian businessman
Jaspal Bhatti (1955–2012), Indian actor
Jaspal Parmar (born 1984), Indian footballer
Jaspal Rana (born 1976), Indian sport shooter
Jaspal Singh (disambiguation), multiple people